William Brayton (August 27, 1787 – August 5, 1828) was a Vermont attorney, politician, and judge.  He served as a justice of the Vermont Supreme Court from 1817 to 1821.

Biography
William Brayton was born in Lansingburgh, New York (now part of the city of Troy) on August 22, 1787.  His family was residing in Greenfield, New York when Brayton attended Williams College from 1800 to 1801.  He left college before graduating, studied law, and attained admission to the bar of Franklin County, Vermont in 1807. Brayton settled in Swanton, where he established a successful practice and became active in politics and government as a member of the Democratic-Republican Party. In addition, he served as Swanton's postmaster from 1809 to 1815. Those who studied law under Brayton with the intention of becoming attorneys included David M. Camp. In 1815, Brayton was named presiding judge of the Franklin County Court.  In 1816, he was chosen as one of Vermont's presidential electors, and he cast his ballot for James Monroe and Daniel D. Tompkins for president and vice president.  In 1817, he represented Swanton in the Vermont House of Representatives.

In 1817, Brayton was appointed a justice of the Vermont Supreme Court, succeeding William A. Palmer, and relocated to St. Albans. He served until 1821, and was succeeded by Charles K. Williams. After leaving the bench he moved to Burlington, where he practiced law until his death.

Death and burial
Brayton died in Burlington on August 5, 1828; he was buried at Elmwood Cemetery in Burlington.

Family
In 1812, Brayton married Hortensia Penniman (1795-1827), the daughter of Frances Montresor (Ethan Allen's widow) and Jabez Penniman.  Their children included: Frances Margaret (1814-1854); Agnes Abigail (1816-1902); Cornelia (1817-1855); William Henry (1820-1854); and Hannibal (1823-1825).

Frances was the wife of Henry Norton, and died in Fayetteville, a now defunct community near Elkhorn, Wisconsin. Agnes married John Adam Brinegar, and died in Granby, Missouri. Cornelia was the wife of Valentine Seman Ferris (1809-1879) of Vergennes.  William Henry died in California.

References

Sources

Books

Internet

Magazines

1787 births
1828 deaths
Politicians from Troy, New York
People from Greenfield, New York
People from Swanton (town), Vermont
People from St. Albans, Vermont
People from Burlington, Vermont
Vermont lawyers
Vermont postmasters
Vermont Democratic-Republicans
Vermont state court judges
Members of the Vermont House of Representatives
Justices of the Vermont Supreme Court
Burials in Vermont
19th-century American politicians
19th-century American judges
19th-century American lawyers